Elliptio shepardiana,, the Altamaha lance, is a species of freshwater mussel, an aquatic bivalve mollusk in the family Unionidae, the river mussels, naiads or unionids.

This species is endemic to the United States.

References

Molluscs of the United States
shepardiana
Bivalves described in 1834
Taxonomy articles created by Polbot